The Uzbekistan women's national U-17 football team is the female age of under-17 team representative football team for Uzbekistan. It has played in two AFC U-17 Women's Asian Cup but has not yet qualified for the FIFA U-17 Women's World Cup.

History
The Uzbekistan women's national under-17 football team represent the country in the women's under age of 17. The team plays AFC U-17 Women's Asian Cup. The team have qualified in the tournament 2013 and 2015 where they exit from group stage. The team has not yet qualified to the FIFA U-17 Women's World Cup.

Current squad
The following squad was announced for 2019 AFC U-16 Women's Championship qualification.

Fixtures and results
https://www.flashscore.co.uk/team/uzbekistan/OY1oxl17/results/

legend

2019

2023
https://www.flashscore.co.uk/team/uzbekistan/OY1oxl17/

 5-2  4 March 2023

 8-0  8 March 2023

Competitive record

FIFA U-17 Women's World Cup

*Draws include knockout matches decided on penalty kicks.

AFC U-17 Women's Asian Cup

*Draws include knockout matches decided on penalty kicks.

AFC U-17 Women's Asian Cup qualification

*Draws include knockout matches decided on penalty kicks.

References

Asian women's national under-17 association football teams
national
W